Stuart John Findlay (born 14 September 1995) is a Scottish professional footballer who plays as a centre-back for EFL League One club Oxford United. He has previously represented the Scotland national team at senior level.

Club career

Celtic
Findlay came through the youth system at Celtic, making his first-team debut in a friendly against Norwich City. He also captained Celtic at under-17 level, and featured regularly for the Development side, taking part in the UEFA Youth League and the English Premier League International Cup.

Greenock Morton (loan)
In January 2014, Findlay signed for Greenock Morton on loan until the end of the season. He made his debut on 1 February in a 1–1 draw against league leaders Falkirk, turning in an impressive performance. Morton spent most of the season in an unsuccessful struggle against relegation, but Findlay continued to show promise. Morton lost 2–1 away at Raith Rovers on 15 March, but Findlay's pace and positional sense restricted Raith's goalscoring chances, and his overall performance was described as showing "composure beyond his years". His spell at Morton ended on an embarrassing note, however, his side losing 10–2 against Hamilton Accies in their last game of the season, including a Findlay own goal.

Dumbarton (loan)
On 16 January 2015, Findlay joined Scottish Championship club Dumbarton on loan until the end of the 2014–15 season. He impressed immediately, and was named the club's player of the month for February. He was noted for his composure with the ball, often carrying the ball out of defence with ease. Findlay himself pointed out that "coming through at Celtic it is in their philosophy that they want to play out from the back, they want their defenders to be good on the ball." His form also saw him named in the Scotland under-21 squad for a friendly with Hungary in March. He left the club at the end of his loan deal, having made 15 appearances and twice been the recipient of the player of the month award.

Kilmarnock (loan)
On 9 July 2015, it was confirmed that Findlay was going out on loan to Kilmarnock for the 2015–16 season. On 1 August 2015, Findlay made his Kilmarnock debut in a 4–0 defeat against Dundee, in which he featured for the entire 90 minutes.

Newcastle United
Findlay joined Football League Championship side Newcastle United on 8 July 2016, following his release from Celtic. He made his debut for Newcastle in an FA Cup tie against Birmingham City on 18 January 2017.

Kilmarnock
In August 2017, Findlay returned to Kilmarnock on loan from Newcastle. He made 36 appearances for the club during the 2017–18 season, then signed permanently with the Rugby Park outfit in July 2018. On 23 September 2018, he scored a last-minute winner in a league fixture at home to former club Celtic, giving Killie a 2–1 victory.

Philadelphia Union
On 25 February 2021, Findlay moved over to the United States, to join Major League Soccer club Philadelphia Union for an undisclosed fee on a two-year deal, with the option to extend a further year.
He made his debut on 15 April 2021, coming off the bench in the side's 4–0 home win against Deportivo Saprissa in the CONCACAF Champions League.
27 June 2021, he made his first start for Philadelphia Union away against Chicago Fire in a 3–3 draw, also his first appearance in Major League Soccer.

Oxford United
On 19 July 2022, Findlay signed for EFL League One club Oxford United for an undisclosed fee on a four-year contract.  He made his debut in the first league game of the season, a 1–0 away defeat to Derby County, and scored his first goal for the club in a 5–0  victory over Leyton Orient in the EFL Trophy group stage on 30 August 2022.

International career
Findlay was first called into the Scotland under-21 squad in November 2012 by coach Ricky Sbragia for a friendly against Portugal. His 13th and final cap at this age level was in October 2015 against France at Pittodrie Stadium.

Findlay received his first call-up to the senior Scotland squad in March 2019 for games against Kazakhstan and San Marino. He earned his first full international cap on 13 October 2019 in a 6–0 win over San Marino at Hampden Park, in which he played the full 90 minutes and scored Scotland's 5th goal.

Personal life
He attended Trinity High School, Rutherglen, and was in the same year group as fellow Celtic youth team player Dom Thomas, who broke through as a professional with Motherwell and was later a teammate at Kilmarnock.

Career statistics

Club

International

Scotland score listed first, score column indicates score after each Findlay goal

References

External links

Newcastle profile at Toon1892

1995 births
Living people
Scottish footballers
People educated at Trinity High School, Rutherglen
Footballers from Glasgow
Scotland youth international footballers
Scotland under-21 international footballers
Association football defenders
Celtic F.C. players
Greenock Morton F.C. players
Dumbarton F.C. players
Kilmarnock F.C. players
Newcastle United F.C. players
Philadelphia Union players
Oxford United F.C. players
Scottish Professional Football League players
Scotland international footballers
Scottish expatriate footballers
Scottish expatriates in the United States
Expatriate soccer players in the United States
Major League Soccer players
MLS Next Pro players
Philadelphia Union II players